John Ross (or John de Rosse) was a Bishop of Carlisle. He was selected on 13 February 1325, and consecrated 24 February 1325.

Ross, along with Archbishop Melton, and the bishops of London and Rochester alone spoke up in Edward II's defence during the Parliamentary session that deposed Edward.

He died in May 1332.

Citations

References

 
 Weir, Alison Queen Isabella: Treachery, Adultery and Murder in Medieval England New York: Ballantine 2005 

Bishops of Carlisle
14th-century English Roman Catholic bishops
1332 deaths
Year of birth unknown